The Father Clements Story is a 1987 American television film about the life of Father George Clements, an African-American Roman Catholic priest who became famous for being the first United States priest to legally adopt a child. The movie starred actors Lou Gossett, Jr., Malcolm-Jamal Warner, and Carroll O'Connor. Gossett, Jr. played Clements, Warner played Clements' adopted son, and O'Connor played Cardinal John Cody, the Archbishop of Chicago. The movie was directed by Edwin Sherin. The film score was composed by Mark Snow.

Plot
Frustrated when his call for volunteers to adopt troubled black youths gets little response from his congregation, a priest in Chicago decides to adopt himself, landing himself in hot water with his superiors in the Church..

References

1987 films
1987 television films
1980s biographical films
African-American films
Films with screenplays by Ted Tally
Films scored by Mark Snow
Films about adoption
Films about Catholic priests
American television films
1980s English-language films